Nanxun is a historic town in Nanxun District of Huzhou, Zhejiang, China.

Name
The name of Nanxun was coined by a combination of the initial Chinese characters of two place' names in the region: "Nanlin" and "Xunxi".

History
Established in 1252 in the Southern Song dynasty (1127–1279), Nanxun is located in the northeast of Huzhou city. It was one of the richest towns in Jiangnan from mid-Ming down to mid-Qing dynasties. During this period, with the development of silk industry and rise of commodity economy, it experienced unprecedented prosperity, and developed into the center of China's silk trade at the beginning of 20th century. It became the most prosperous town in Jiangnan region, producing hundreds of magnates. As a popular saying went, "What counts as a city in Huzhou is barely half the size of Nanxun."

Religion
The introduction of Christianity into the Nanxun area began in 1860, belonging to the American Methodist Episcopal Mission. The Nanxun Christian Church is a Protestant church in the town. It was built in 1927.

The Guanghui Palace is a Taoist temple in the town. It was first established in the Northern Song dynasty (960–1127) and was destroyed and rebuilt many times. The present version was completed in 2003.

Tourist attractions
Nanxun once had a large number of gardens. From the Southern Song dynasty down to the Qing dynasty (1644–1911) it had housed as much as 27 gardens. Among the survived ones are the Baijian Houses, Jiaye Library, Liu's Xiaolian Manor, (Chen's) Ying Garden and (Zhang's) Shi Garden.

Nanxun is also the home to the Former Residence of Zhang Shiming and Former Residence of Zhang Jingjiang.

Nanxun has more well-preserved ancient bridges of the Ming (1368–1644) and Qing dynasties (1644–1911) with hundreds of years of history, such as Tongjin Bridge, Hongji Bridge, Guanghui Bridge, and Chuihong Bridge.

Notable people
 Zhu Guozhen, an official, historian, and scholar of the Ming dynasty.
 
 Zhuang Tinglong, historian.
 , historian.
 , a tycoon in Nanxun.
 , a tycoon in Nanxun.
 , philologist.
 Zhang Renjie, a political figure and financial entrepreneur in the Republic of China.
 Jin Zhang, prominent painter and calligrapher

Gallery

References

Bibliography
 

Traditional folk houses in China
Ancient Chinese cities
Huzhou